was a Japanese film actor. He appeared in more than ninety films from 1947 to 1979.

Career
Itō made his film debut at Toho in 1946, and although mostly a prominent supporting actor—playing memorable figures such as the novelist in Akira Kurosawa's Ikiru—he also was cast in leading roles such as Kon Ichikawa's Mr. Pu. He is acclaimed as "one of the...extremely talented character actors who populated Japanese movies in [the Shōwa] era, playing a broad range of roles."

Itō received the 1962 Blue Ribbon Award for Best Supporting Actor for his dual role in the seminal ninja film Shinobi no Mono. Film scholar Stuart Galbraith IV has noted that the "horse-faced actor...was a real chameleon, despite his instantly recognizable, distinctive features...[and] gives what may be the performance of his career [as] one of the all-time great Japanese movie villains.The son of kabuki actor Sawamura Sōnosuke I (1886-1924), Itō was the brother of actor Sōnosuke Sawamura (1918-1978), who was born Keinosuke Itō and took the name Sawamura Sōnosuke II when their father died, appearing on stage until the 1950s when he also became a TV and film actor, though never achieving his younger brother's renown.

Legacy
In 2008, Itō was one of the actors commemorated in the Seven Supporting Characters film festival held at the now-defunct Cinema Artone in Tokyo's Shimokitazawa entertainment district. 

Tokyo's arthouse theatre Laputa Asagaya curated a 30-film retrospective in 2011 titled Great Character Actor of the Century: Fantastic Yūnosuke Itō. 

In July 2019, Tokyo's Cinemavera Shibuya celebrated the 100th anniversary of his birth by screening 11 of his films in a shared festival honoring Itō and actor Kō Nishimura.

A character designed as a caricature of Itō is regularly featured in the cat-oriented manga Mon-chan and Me, published in Fusosha's popular webzine Joshi Spa!'' (Women's Spa!).

Selected filmography

Films

Television

References

External links
 

1919 births
1980 deaths
People from Tokyo
Japanese male film actors